Glazzard is a surname. Notable people with the surname include:

Jimmy Glazzard (1923–1995), British footballer
Malcolm Glazzard (1931–2012), British footballer

See also
Gazzard